Hughes Eng, O. Ont, is a community activist in the Chinese community in Toronto, Ontario, Canada.

Eng immigrated to Canada from China during the period of the Chinese Exclusion Act, an experience that lead to his role in getting compensation from the Government of Canada. After graduating from Ryerson Polytechnical Institute (1959)  with a degree in Printing Management, he worked at the University of Toronto Press for 28 years and retired in 1987.

He has been Vice-Chair of the Board of the Chinese Cultural Centre of Greater Toronto (1991)  and Co-Chair of the National Congress of Chinese Canadians, as well as:

 Vice-Chair of the Canadian Liver Foundation, 1989 to 1995 
 Chair of the Confederation of the Toronto Chinese Canadian Organizations, 1994 to 1998 
 Member of the Chinese-Canadian Advisory Committee under the Community Historical Recognition Program 2008–present 

In 2006 Eng was awarded the Order of Ontario for being the founding director of both the National Congress of Chinese and Chinavision (now Fairchild TV) and for providing decades of exemplary community service in Ontario.  He is the father of Ben (Toronto Police Service), Margaret, Rose and Robert, grandfather of David, Heather, Elizabeth, Claire and Neil and great-grandfather to Hudson, Claira, Parker, and Callum, distant relative of Susan Eng.

Cited References

See also

Chinese Immigration Act, 1923
Order of Ontario

External links
Chinese Cultural Centre of Greater Toronto: Board of Directors 2010–2011

Chinese emigrants to Canada
Members of the Order of Ontario
Living people
Year of birth missing (living people)